Francio may be:
The eponymous founder of the Franks according to the Liber Historiae Francorum
The Italian name of Francium
The Esperanto name of France